Vademecum filipino o manual de conversación familiar español-tágalog is a classic Spanish-language textbook for learning the Tagalog language by Venancia María de Abelli, first published in 1868. It is one of the oldest works of this type.

The work quickly gained considerable popularity, until 1876 there were as many as 14 of its editions. Valued for picking up a number of terms and expressions popular in Manila of that time, it also contains important information about the sociolinguistic situation in the Philippines in the second half of the 19th century. The material contained therein was widely used by later lexicographical studies, including Diccionario de filipinismos (1921) by Wenceslao Retana.

References 

.

1868 books
Language textbooks
Tagalog language
History of the Philippines (1565–1898)